{{DISPLAYTITLE:C15H13I2NO4}}
The molecular formula C15H13I2NO4 (molar mass: 525.08 g/mol) may refer to:

 3,3'-Diiodothyronine (3,3-T2)
 3,5-Diiodothyronine (3,5-T2)

Molecular formulas